is a Japanese university professor and philosopher. He is reputed as one of the greatest people to have influenced the Japanese philosophy.

Career 
He studied from 1949 to 1957 at the Tohoku University in the field of philosophy. He also received a scholarship from the Alexander von Humboldt Foundation to study at the University of Cologne.

Between 1970 and until his retirement in 1999, he taught philosophy as a full professor at the Toyo University.

Footnotes

References

External links 
 Yoshihiro Nitta philosophy

1929 births
Living people
Japanese philosophers
Japanese literature academics
20th-century Japanese educators
Tohoku University alumni
University of Cologne alumni
People from Ishikawa Prefecture